Alessandro Tonucci (born 23 April 1993) is a Grand Prix motorcycle racer from Italy. He currently rides a Kawasaki ZX-6R in the CIV Supersport Championship. He is a former runner-up of the Italian 125GP Championship, doing so in 2009.

Career statistics

By season

Races by year
(key)

References

External links

1993 births
Living people
Italian motorcycle racers
125cc World Championship riders
Moto3 World Championship riders
Moto2 World Championship riders
Sportspeople from the Province of Pesaro and Urbino
People from Fano